Aiki may refer to:

 Aiki (martial arts principle), in Japanese martial arts
 Aiki language, spoken in Chad
 Aiki (film), a 2002 Japanese film
 Aiki (manga)
 Aiki Framework, a PHP + MYSQL (LAMP) web application framework
 Ariki, a noble rank

It sometimes used as a short form for aiki arts such as:
 Aikido 
 Aiki-jō
 Aiki-ken 
 Aikijujutsu

People with the surname
Ellinor Aiki (1893–1969), Estonian painter
Takashi Aiki (born 1978), Japanese baseball player
Aiki Miyahara (born 2002), Japanese footballer 
Aiki Segi (born 1991), Japanese footballer

Japanese-language surnames
Japanese masculine given names